Abdelhamid Slama (born 23 October 1941) is a Tunisian politician. He is the former Minister of Sport, Youth, and Physical Education.

Biography
Abdelhamid Slama was born on 23 October 1941 in Ksibet El Mediouni, Tunisia. He holds a PhD in Arabic literature.

He taught in Sousse and in Tunis, then worked for the Ministry of Education, the Ministry of Youth and Sports, and the Ministry of Information.

He is a board member of the Constitutional Democratic Rally.

References

1941 births
Government ministers of Tunisia
Living people